Fulbright & Jaworski L.L.P. (now Norton Rose Fulbright US LLP), was founded in Houston, TX in 1919 by R.C. Fulbright. On June 3, 2013, the firm became part of the global law firm Norton Rose Fulbright, a Swiss verein.

Norton Rose Fulbright US LLP has represented clients in the energy, financial and healthcare industries. As trustees of the M.D. Anderson Foundation, Fulbright & Jaworski LLP partners were instrumental in the establishment of the Texas Medical Center, the largest medical system in the world. During its first 50 years, the firm's transportation work included representing the Port of Houston and industries along the Houston Ship Channel.

The late Leon Jaworski, a partner in the firm, headed the investigations into Nazi war crimes during World War II, resulting in the Nuremberg trials. He also served as Assistant to the Attorney General of the United States in the 1963 civil rights case involving James Meredith’s admission to the University of Mississippi, then as Watergate Special Prosecutor, 1973–74.

Notable attorneys
Richard Beckler
Alfred H. Bennett
Carolyn Dineen King
Sim Lake
Gray H. Miller
Stephen Susman (1941-2020)

References

External links

Norton Rose Fulbright website
Fulbright & Jaworski timeline

Law firms established in 1919
Law firms based in Houston
Foreign law firms with offices in Hong Kong
1919 establishments in Texas